Brud is a given name and surname. Notable people with the name include: 

Brud Talbot (1938–1986), American film actor, producer, director, and writer
Daniel Brud (born 1989), Polish footballer
Lulu Brud (born 1985), American actress and interior designer